Triumph of the Human Spirit is a 2000 black granite sculpture by Lorenzo Pace, installed at Manhattan's Foley Square, in the U.S. state of New York. The sculpture is sited near a rediscovered Colonial-era African Burial Ground, and its support structure alludes to the slave trade's Middle Passage.  The work was commissioned by the New York City Government program Percent for Art.

See also
 2000 in art
 African Burial Ground National Monument, Lower Manhattan

References

External links 
 NYC Parks: Honoring the African-American Experience: Triumph of the Human Spirit
 NYC Parks: Historical Sign for Triumph of the Human Spirit

2000 establishments in New York City
2000 sculptures
Abstract sculptures in New York City
African-American history in New York City
Civic Center, Manhattan
Fountains in New York City
Granite sculptures in New York City
Monuments and memorials in Manhattan
Outdoor sculptures in Manhattan